Lalith Vasantha Jayasundara (born 4 February 1953) is a Sri Lankan former cricket umpire. He stood in nine ODI games between 1999 and 2001.

Jayasundara, an old boy of Isipathana College, represented his school at cricket in all age groups and captained the 1st XI team in 1972. He went on to play for Panadura Sports Club. He continued his cricket at the Colombo Cricket Club, Colts Cricket Club and the Wellawatte Spinning and Weaving Mills where he was employed.

See also
 List of One Day International cricket umpires

References

1953 births
Living people
Sri Lankan One Day International cricket umpires
People from Colombo
Alumni of Isipathana College